Joseph Lucien Charles Napoléon Bonaparte, 3rd Prince of Canino and Musignano (12 February 1824 – 2 September 1865), was born in Philadelphia as the son of Charles Lucien Bonaparte and his wife (and cousin), Zénaïde Bonaparte.

Upon his grandfather Joseph Bonaparte's death in 1844, Joseph Lucien inherited the estate at Point Breeze in Bordentown, New Jersey. Joseph Lucien did not keep the properties and instead put Point Breeze up to be auctioned in 1847. It was bought by businessman Thomas Richards, who was a founder of the Jackson Glass Works in Batsto, New Jersey.

Joseph Lucien succeeded his father as 3rd Prince of Canino and Musignano upon his death on 29 July 1857. Following the death of Joseph Lucien at the age of 41 in Rome, his brother Lucien succeeded him as 4th Prince of Canino and Musignano.

Ancestry

References

Footnotes

1824 births
1865 deaths
Joseph Lucien Bonaparte
Joseph Lucien Bonaparte
People from Philadelphia
Joseph Lucien Bonaparte